The 2021–22 Ekstraklasa (also known as PKO Ekstraklasa due to sponsorship reasons) was the 96th season of the Polish Football Championship, the 88th season of the highest tier domestic division in the Polish football league system since its establishment in 1927 and the 14th season of the Ekstraklasa under its current title. The league is operated by the Ekstraklasa S.A.

The regular season was played as a round-robin tournament. A total of 18 teams participated, 15 of which competed in the league campaign during the previous season, while the remaining three were promoted from the 2020–21 I liga. The season started on 23 July 2021 and concluded on 21 May 2022. Each team played a total of 34 matches, half at home and half away. It was the first season in the formula with 18 teams, instead of 16. The bottom three teams of the final league table were relegated. It was the fifth Ekstraklasa season to use VAR.

Teams
A total of 18 teams participated in the 2021–22 Ekstraklasa season.

Changes from last season
Podbeskidzie Bielsko-Biała had been relegated to 2021–22 I liga, ending their one-year stay in the top flight. The 2021–22 season is Radomiak Radom’s first season in the top flight since the 1984–85 season, and their first season after the league’s name change in 2008. Bruk-Bet Termalica Nieciecza returned to the top flight after 3 years, having last played in the 2017–18 season. The third, and last team, to be promoted was Górnik Łęczna, returning after a four-year absence.

Stadiums and locations
Note: Table lists in alphabetical order.

 Upgrading to 31,871.
 Upgrading to 21,163.
 Due to the renovation of Stadion im. Braci Czachorów in Radom, Radomiak will play home matches at the Stadion Lekkoatletyczno-Piłkarski in Radom.
 Due to the renovation of Dębińska Road Stadium in Poznań, Warta will play home matches at the Stadion Dyskobolii in Grodzisk Wielkopolski.
 Upgrading to 15,000.

Personnel and kits

Managerial changes

Italics for interim managers.

League table

Results

Results by round

Season statistics

Top goalscorers

Top assists

Hat-tricks

Attendances

Awards

Monthly awards

Player of the Month

Young Player of the Month

Coach of the Month

Annual awards

Number of teams by region

See also
2021–22 I liga
2021–22 II liga
2021–22 III liga
2021–22 Polish Cup
2021 Polish Super Cup

Notes

References

External links
 
Ekstraklasa at uefa.com 

Ekstraklasa seasons
1
Poland